William Rimmer (20 February 181620 August 1879) was an American artist born in Liverpool, England.

Biography 
William Rimmer was the son of a French refugee, who emigrated to Nova Scotia, where he was joined by his wife and child in 1818, and who in 1826 moved to Boston, where he earned a living as a shoemaker. Rimmer's father "believed himself to be the French dauphin, the son of Louis XVI and Marie Antoinette. " The son learned the father's trade; at fifteen became a draughtsman and sign-painter; then worked for a lithographer; opened a studio and painted some ecclesiastical pictures.

In 1840 Rimmer made a tour of New England painting portraits, he lived in Randolph, Massachusetts, in 1845–1855 as a shoemaker, for the last years of the decade practising medicine; practised in East Chelsea, Massachusetts and received a diploma from the Suffolk County Medical Society and in 1855 removed to East Milton, Massachusetts where he supplemented his income by carving busts from blocks of granite.

In 1860 Rimmer made his head of St. Stephen and in 1861 his Falling Gladiator. Rimmer's sculptures, except those mentioned and The Fighting Lions, A Dying Centaur, and a statue of Alexander Hamilton (made in 1865 for the city of Boston), were soon destroyed. He worked in clay, not modelling but building up and chiselling; almost always without models or preliminary sketches; and always under technical disadvantages and in great haste; but his sculpture is anatomically remarkable and has an early Greek simplicity and strength.

From 1866 to 1870 he was director of the Cooper Union School of Design for Women in New York City. Among his pupils there was Ella Ferris Pell.  He died in South Milford, Mass., on Aug. 20, 1879.

Rimmer published Elements of Design (1864) and Art Anatomy (1877), but his great work was in the classroom, where his lectures were illustrated with blackboard sketches.

Rimmer's most famous work, though not normally associated with him, is Evening: Fall of Day, which was the basis for the Swan Song Records logo that the English rock group Led Zeppelin used.  Another celebrated painting is his Flight and Pursuit in the Boston Museum of Fine Arts.

His daughter Caroline Hunt Rimmer was also a sculptor and noted author of Figure Drawing for Children.

References

1816 births
1879 deaths
19th-century American sculptors
American male sculptors
British emigrants to the United States
People from Milton, Massachusetts
Artists from Liverpool
19th century in Boston
19th-century American painters
American male painters
19th-century male artists
Painters from Massachusetts
Sculptors from Massachusetts
Cooper Union faculty